Emma Inamutila Theofelus (born 28  March 1996) is a Namibian politician, currently serving as deputy minister of Information, Communication and Technology. She is the current youngest woman government minister in both Africa and Namibia, and she was just 23 years old at the time of her appointment in March 2020. A lot of people were not happy with Emma's appointment as a deputy minister of ICT, and this was her respond to them “I do not think I am special, I do not think I am inexperienced, and I do not think my age or gender has anything to do with my appointment. Anything I set myself to and any environment I want to work into, I can do it. The issue of inexperience does not hold any water,” Emma says".

Career 
Theofelus is a former youth activist, having served as deputy speaker of the Children's Parliament from 2013 to 2018. She started her career after she completed a law degree at the University of Namibia, as legal officer in the Ministry of Justice. The call from the State House came as a surprise.

The appointment of younger leaders to high office is not entirely new in Africa. Theofelus was appointed Namibia's deputy minister of Information, Communication and Technology in March 2020, as part of Hage Geingob's second term cabinet. In her role, she was tasked with assisting in leading public communication on preventative steps against Namibia's COVID-19 pandemic. At the time of cabinet appointment, Theofelus was 23 and one of Africa's youngest cabinet ministers. She is also a board member of the National Council of Higher Education.

As a deputy minister, she led the country’s public communication campaign on COVID-19 preventions in Namibia, and as a Member of Parliament, her motion enabled feminine hygiene products to be identified as a tax-free commodity. Prior to her appointment, Theofelus was a member of the Namibia chapter of AfriYAN, a regional youth-led organisation, where she led pioneering efforts to fight teen pregnancy and protect young people’s sexual and reproductive health.

Achievements 
In 2020 she was judged to be one of 100 most influential African women, the youngest person on this list. In 2021 Theophelus was recognized as one of the BBC's 100 women of the year. She also received the 2022 United Nations Population Award individual laureate award for her work advocating for women’s empowerment and adolescent sexual and reproductive health in Namibia

In 2021, Theofelus proposed a motion on the removal of the tax on sanitary pads in Parliament. In 2022, the motion was put into effect when the Minister of Finance Iipumbu Shiimi announced the abolishment of Value Added Tax on sanitary pads, according to the Tax Amendment Act of 2022, effective since 1 January 2023.

Interests 
Her legislative interests are parliament oversight, parliamentary self-development, E-parliament, climate change legislation, youth participation in parliament, and parliamentary research

References

External links

Government ministers of Namibia
Women government ministers of Namibia
University of Namibia alumni
1996 births
Living people
Year of birth uncertain
21st-century Namibian women politicians
21st-century Namibian politicians
BBC 100 Women